Strategies for International Development (SID) is a U.S. 501(c)(3) nonprofit that develops, promotes, and applies methods for eradicating rural poverty in Bolivia, Guatemala, and Peru.

Operations 
SID helps farmers meet and negotiate with buyers, assess their alternatives for increasing income, and use business plans to make better decisions. They then help farmers adopt the farming practices that increase their productivity, product quality, value-added processing, and income in accordance with the opportunities of their market.

Innovations 
SID has developed seven innovations which it utilizes for its operations. The innovations are considered to be important strategies to graduate poor farmers from poverty. SID calls these processes "innovations" because they are not commonly used by a significant portion of the rural development sector.

 Make graduation from poverty the goal of your agricultural project
 Help farmers adopt basic business practices as well as better farming practices
 Help farmers select the farming practices they will adopt and evaluate their results
 Use "learn-by-doing" as the methodology for technical assistance in adopting both business and farming practices
 Make reclaiming eroded land an objective and component of all projects
 Make equal participation of women a condition of all projects
 Measure results in terms of increases in farmers' income and cost-effectiveness as the ratio of the increases to project cost

History  
Since its creation in the 1990s, SID has worked to graduate poor farmers from poverty in Guatemala, Peru, and Bolivia.

Guatemala 
From 2004 to 2006, SID helped farmers in the region of Northern Chimaltenango to create business plans, reclaim land, and increase productivity and income for products such as eggs, amaranth, coffee, artisanal weaving, corn, beans, and lemons.

During 2007 to 2011, SID focused its efforts exclusively on coffee production, as coffee was seen as the major cash crop of the region and the greatest opportunity for an increase in income. SID worked to increase coffee production per acre and to increase the amount of coffee that families husked.

In late 2012, a severe attack of coffee leaf rust swept through Central America, dramatically reducing the growth of coffee. From April 2012 to March 2013, the average income of families significantly fell. SID responded by helping farmers spray trees with antifungal and aggressively pruning and shading to reduce humidity and the spread of the leaf rust. By the 2013/14 coffee year, farmers began regaining their income they had lost to the coffee rust.

Peru 
From 2000 to 2004, SID worked with environmental and agricultural NGOs to improve the coverage and impact of their projects. By 2004, SID had assisted 23 NGOs to redesign their projects to effectively address both environmental and agricultural goals.

In 2005, SID began helping producers' associations near Lake Titicaca to increase the productivity and income on a variety of products and services including dairy products, wool, and tourism. SID helped producers assess their markets and identify opportunities to increase sales.

In 2009 and 2010, SID worked on democracy building by helping citizens in dairy and alpaca wool producing municipalities to select projects, establish priorities, and define farming practices in order to increase assistance in infrastructure and inputs from municipal governments. Simultaneously, starting in 2008 and ending in 2012, SID worked with alpaca wool producing families in the highlands of Arequipa to increase their income through reclaiming eroded pastures, sorting and classifying wool prior to sale, and selling directly to exporters.

Bolivia 
From 1996 to 2001, SID began working with farming families in the municipalities of Patacamaya and Umala in the Central Altiplano to reclaim land and increase income using competitions among communities and technical assistance. In 2000 SID worked with other NGOs in Bolivia to reclaim eroded land and increase productivity and income in the same project. Addressing these two goals in the same project improved participation and helped solve two very related problems. Next, SID began working with dairy farmers in Sica Sica in 2002. Farmers reclaimed land and increased the productivity of their cows.

In 2007, SID helped alpaca and llama-wool producers in Curahuara de Carangas to make business decisions, reclaim land, and increase the productivity of their animals. SID helped producers increase their production of white wool which sold for a higher price. In 2007, SID also worked with producers' associations throughout the Northern and Central Altiplano meet and negotiate with buyers, make business plans, increase productivity as well as product quality, and evaluate market opportunities.

Additionally, SID worked intensely on democracy building projects. SID helped build democracy at the local level by developing the methods and materials that Bolivian citizens used to select and supervise the public works provided by their local government. Also, in the early 2000s, SID worked to help other NGOs with their democracy building techniques. SID illustrated how NGOs could still build democratic practice in municipalities with little money to allocate projects.

Current Notable Projects

Guatemala 
SID works in the region of Alta Verapaz, the poorest region in Guatemala, to help coffee-farming families to adopt basic business practices, control the coffee leaf rust, and increase productivity and husking in order to increase income. SID also recently started a women's empowerment project which encourages equal leadership and participation from women.

Peru 
SID works with 12 dairy producers' associations in the municipalities of Atuncolla, Caracoto, Huata, and Capachica to make business plans, negotiate with buyers, and increase productivity of their cows. SID also teaches farmers methods to reclaim and prevent eroded land.

Bolivia 
SID helps quinoa farmers in the Northern Altiplano adopt farming and business practices to increase productivity and income and to reclaim and prevent eroded land. SID recently graduated the first group of farmers from the program, and the second group will graduate in mid 2017.

Awards 
In 2005, SID was awarded as winners of the World Bank Development Marketplace Competition for a project in Bolivia entitled "Competing to Reclaim Eroded Soils and Pastures."

References

External links
 

Non-profit organizations based in Washington, D.C.
Development charities based in the United States
Economic development organizations in the United States
Organizations established in 1991
1991 establishments in Washington, D.C.
Foreign charities operating in Bolivia
Foreign charities operating in Peru
Foreign charities operating in Guatemala